Dheri Likpani is a  union council in Tehsil Katlang . Mardan District of Khyber Pakhtunkhwa.

The Dheri Likpani consist of four village council ;

1) Dheri

2) Likapni

3) Charchor

4) Jahngi Dher

References

Union councils of Mardan District
Populated places in Mardan District